Sansonia is a genus of small sea snails, marine gastropod molluscs in the subfamily Pickworthiinae of the family Pickworthiidae.

Species
 Sansonia alisonae Le Renard & Bouchet, 2003
 Sansonia andamanica (Preston, 1908)
 Sansonia cebuana Bandel & Kowalke, 1997
 Sansonia costata Kase, 1998
 Sansonia halligani (Hedley, 1899)
 Sansonia hilutangensis Bandel & Kowalke, 1997
 Sansonia iejimensis Kase, 1998
 Sansonia kirkpatricki (Iredale, 1917)
 Sansonia nuda Kase, 1998
 Sansonia shigemitsui Kase, 1998
 Sansonia sumatrensis (Thiele, 1925)
 Sansonia tuberculata (R. B. Watson, 1886)
Synonyms
 Sansonia andrei Jousseaume, 1921: synonym of Sansonia kirkpatricki (Iredale, 1917) 
 Sansonia christinae Selli, 1974: synonym of Sansonia kirkpatricki (Iredale, 1917) 
 Sansonia fauroti Jousseaume, 1921: synonym of Sansonia andamanica (Preston, 1908) 
 † Sansonia italica Raffi & Taviani, 1985: synonym of Mareleptopoma minor (Almera & Bofill, 1898)
 † Sansonia kenneyi (Ladd, 1966): synonym of † Mareleptopoma kenneyi (Ladd, 1966) 
 Sansonia sansonia Jousseaume, 1921: synonym of Sansonia andamanica (Preston, 1908) 
 Sansonia semisculpta Espinosa & Fernández-Garcés, 1990: synonym of Cubasansonia semisculpta (Espinosa & Fernández-Garcés, 1990) (original combination)
 Sansonia umbilicata Jousseaume, 1921: synonym of Sansonia andamanica (Preston, 1908)

References

External links
 Iredale, T. (1917). On some new species of marine mollusca from Christmas Island, Indian Ocean. Proceedings of the Malacological Society of London. 12: 331-334.